Lechenaultia stenosepala, commonly known as narrow-sepaled leschenaultia, is a species of flowering plant in the family Goodeniaceae and is endemic to the south-west of Western Australia. It is an open, more or less erect perennial herb or shrub with crowded, narrow leaves, and blue to pale blue or creamy-white flowers.

Description
The flowers are arranged in compact groups and are blue to pale blue or creamy-white.

Taxonomy
Lechenaultia stenosepala was first formally described in 1964 by Ernst Georg Pritzel in the Botanische Jahrbücher für Systematik, Pflanzengeschichte und Pflanzengeographie from specimens collected near Dandaragan. The specific epithet (stenosepala) means "narrow-sepalled".

Distribution and habitat
Narrow-sepaled leschenaultia grows in low, open heath between Three Springs and Gingin in the Avon Wheatbelt, Geraldton Sandplains, Jarrah Forest and Swan Coastal Plain biogeographic regions of south-western Western Australia.

Conservation status
This leschenaultia is listed as "not threatened" by the Government of Western Australia Department of Biodiversity, Conservation and Attractions.

References

Asterales of Australia
 pulvinaris
Eudicots of Western Australia
Plants described in 1964
Taxa named by Ernst Pritzel